Bongard can refer to:

Geography
Bongard, a municipality in western Germany
Bongard, Iran, a village in Hormozgan Province, Iran
 Bongárd, the Hungarian name for Bungard village, Șelimbăr Commune, Sibiu County, Romania

Computer science
Bongard problems, is a kind of puzzle invented by the Soviet computer scientist Mikhail Moiseevich Bongard

People
Josh Bongard, a professor in the University of Vermont
August Gustav Heinrich von Bongard, a German botanist (1786–1839)

Other
Bertram F. Bongard Stakes, an ungraded stakes race at Belmont Park, New York